Ságvár is a village in Somogy county, Hungary.

Etymology
According to the local legends the settlement was named after a pasha called Ság who had a castle there. Researchers agree that Ság was a Kabar or Hungarian person name which could be the name of its first owner. The word ság meant in old Hungarian domb or erdős magaslat. Vár refers to the traces of a Roman castle in Ságvár.

History
According to László Szita the settlement was completely Hungarian in the 18th century.

External links 
 Street map (Hungarian)

References 

Populated places in Somogy County